Rupertia is a small genus of flowering plants in the legume family, Fabaceae. It belongs to the subfamily Faboideae. There are three species native to western North America, especially California. Two of the species are quite rare.

Three species:
Rupertia hallii (Rydb.) J.W. Grimes
Rupertia physodes (Douglas ex Hook.) J.W.Grimes
Rupertia rigida (Parish) J.W.Grimes

References

External links
USDA Plants Profile

Psoraleeae
Taxa named by James Walter Grimes
Fabaceae genera